Mangaon is a small town (and taluka) in the Konkan region of Maharashtra, India.

Industrial development
The Vile-Bhagad M.I.D.C. industrial zone, which is located in Mangaon, was previously in a dilapidated state due to a lack of investment. Lately, however, the zone has increased in importance and houses several steel companies, including POSCO LTD. Moreover, Tata Power Ltd.'s hydroelectric project has greatly reduced the need for additional energy generation in the Mangaon Taluka and industrial zones in Raigad. Recently  have been declared under MIDC acquisition in Mangaon. Phase-2 Mangaon MIDC includes  Bamangaon|Shiravli|Sakhalewadi|Jite|Titave|Maluste etc.

Dr. Babasaheb Ambedkar Technical University

The Dr. Babasaheb technical University, Lonere was established in the Mangaon taluka mainly catering to industrial and technical industries and offers several courses in petroleum and chemical technology. The university primarily attracts students from Konkan, but also from other parts of Maharashtra, including Marathawada, Vidarbha and West Maharashtra, many of whom attend the university to pursue courses such as petrochemical and petroleum chemical engineering which are only taught in a few universities across India.

Konkan Railway
The development of Mangaon was boosted by the arrival of the Konkan Railway. Mangaon and Roha are the only railway stations near a taluka in Southern Raigad.

Mangaon railway station is the nearest station to Shrivardhan, Dive Agar, Hari-Hareshwar, Mhasala, Tala, Nijampur, Mahad, Raigad and Poladpur. It provides employment for several areas, including Auto-Rickshawala, Minidor, and Taxi-Van drivers who provide transport services from the Mangaon railway station to more remote locations.

Attractions
Mangad fort lies in the Manjarwane Panchayat area, situated 15 km from the taluka market area of Nijampur. The fort consists of one main gate connected to a set of mountains. Nearby you can find the Kumbhe waterfall.

Raigad fort in Mahad taluka is 22 kilometres from Mangaon, making the town a convenient access point to the fort.

Tirupati temple is also considered highly important and noteworthy place in Mangaon.

The hydroelectric project at Bhira that generates power for the whole taluka is also considered a place of interest for visitors.

'''Raigad Agro Farms, Raigad Organic Farms is popular farmland investment region in Mangaon. 

Other famous sites of Mangaon:
 The tunnel at Kumbhe and Kumbhe waterfall.
 The Bapuji and mahakali temple at Kadape.
 The sports centre at Khardi.
 The Ganpati and Mugawali Temples along the river Kaal.
 The temple of the local goddess Vakdai.
 Swayambhu Hanuman temple Gharoshi.

Administrative subdivisions
There are 187 villages in Mangaon taluka, organized into 74 panchayats.

Panchayats

References

 Cities and towns in Raigad district
 Talukas in Maharashtra